Qacha's Nek is, since 1888, the camptown (capital) of Qacha's Nek District in Lesotho, only two kilometers from the South African border at  above sea level. It has a population of approximately 15,900 (2016).

Tourism features
The town is home to Lesotho's first and only Snake Park, which is conveniently situated at the foot of the historic Letloepe hill/rock formation. This is where the cave of Qacha, the son of the Baphuthi chief Moorosi, after whom the town is named, is situated. ("Letloepe" means the cobra's defensive hood, and is the alternative name for Qacha's Nek). The locality may be the only place in Africa where California Redwood trees grow (the area is visible on the photo, to the right-hand side of the wooded Letloepe hill).

As one enters the town from Maseru (1 km from the road in the picture), one can see the famous lefika-motho ("man-rock"), which looks like a man's head with a cap on. There are several spots where San paintings can still be found. The Sehlabathebe National Park, home of the Sehlabathebe water lily, is about 2.5 hours away by gravel road.

Demography
The people of Qacha's Nek are called "Melele" (Wanderers), and the colours of the place / district are maroon and white. Other than Sesotho and English, people speak Xhosa and Sephuthi.

Climate
The town has 900 mm precipitation per year, the highest annual rainfall of any Lesotho district capitals. From the nearby Indian Ocean clouds move up almost daily, so that in Qacha's Nek fog often prevails. In the summer, the average temperature is 17 °C. Because of its climate, Qacha's Nek is green longer than most other places in Lesotho every year, and is very refreshing. There is an increasing population of fauna like snails, and the place has always had several species of rare flora.

Border Post

References

Populated places in Qacha's Nek District
Lesotho–South Africa border crossings